The Battle of the River Idle was a major victory for Rædwald of East Anglia over Æthelfrith of Northumbria in 616 or 617 in modern-day England.

Background 
Æthelfrith was King of Bernicia from c. 593. Around 604 under unknown circumstances, he gained control of neighbouring Deira, and forced into exile two notable members of the Deiran royal family, Edwin, son of the former king Ælla, and Hereric, Edwin's nephew.

Hereric was poisoned while at the court of Ceretic, king of Elmet. It was probably Æthelfrith whom to blame for this killing. The second exile, Edwin, ended up eventually under the protection of Rædwald in East Anglia. Æthelfrith sent messengers to Rædwald asking him to kill Edwin. Rædwald did not comply, and instead, he raised an army to confront Æthelfrith.

Battle 
Rædwald assembled an army and marched north, accompanied by his son Rægenhere, to confront Æthelfrith. They met on the western boundary of the kingdom of Lindsey, on the east bank of the River Idle. The battle was fierce and was long commemorated in the saying, 'The river Idle was foul with the blood of Englishmen'. During the fighting, Æthelfrith and Rædwald's son Rægenhere were both slain. Edwin then succeeded Æthelfrith as the king of Northumbria, and Æthelfrith's sons were subsequently forced into exile.

A separate account of the battle, given by Henry of Huntingdon, stated that Rædwald's army was split into three formations, led by Rædwald, Rægenhere, and Edwin. With more experienced fighters, Æthelfrith attacked in loose formation. At the sight of Rægenhere, perhaps thinking he was Edwin, Æthelfrith's men cut their way through to him and slew him. After the death of his son, Rædwald furiously breached his lines, killing Æthelfrith amid a great slaughter of the Northumbrians.

Aftermath 
While presented by Bede as being fought simply over the issue of Edwin, this war may have actually involved issues of power and territory between the two rulers.  D.P. Kirby has argued that the battle was more than a clash between two kings over the treatment of an exiled nobleman but was "part of a protracted struggle to determine the military and political leadership of the Anglian peoples" at that time. After the Æthelfrith's death, Edwin became king of both kingdoms, Deira and Bernicia, and this time in return, Æthelfrith's sons Eanfrith, Oswald, and Oswiu fled to the north.

Notes

References

Sources 
 
 
 
 

616
617
610s conflicts
7th century in England
River Idle